Lenta can refer to:
 Lenta (retail), a Russian hyper- and supermarket chain
 Lenta, Piedmont, a municipality in Italy
 Lenta.ru, a Russian online newspaper
 Lenta (лента), ribbon or tape in the Russian language
 Especially the ribbon of Saint George
 a barley cultivar

See also 
 Lentas, a coastal village in Crete